Russell Ong was Captain of Team Singapore Swimming who won a total of nine medals at the 2007, 2009, 2011, and 2013 Southeast Asian Games.

Education 
Ong studied at Anglo-Chinese School (Independent). He previously studied at University of Melbourne but gave up his studies there after returning to Singapore when his older sister died in Singapore. Ong resumed his studies in Singapore Management University.

Career

Swimming career 
Ong wanted to be Southeast Asia's fasted man but failed to do so, winning the bronze medals in the 50m freestyle event at the 2007, 2009 and the 2011 Southeast Asian Games.

In 2014, Ong became the chairman of the Athletes' Commission of the Singapore Swimming Association.

In August 2015, Ong announced retirement from swimming after failing to qualify for the 2015 Southeast Asian Games.

Media career 
In 2012, Ong starred in a Singaporean horror film, Ghost Child.

Ong starred in Mediacorp's Channel 5's drama series Lion Moms, and hosted Channel NewsAsia travelogue, Luxe Asia 4, showing lifestyles of Asia’s rich and famous people and expensive locations.

Financial career 
Ong is also the co-founder and Chief Financial Officer of a Shanghai-based tech start-up.

References

Year of birth missing (living people)
Living people
Singaporean male freestyle swimmers
Southeast Asian Games medalists in swimming
Southeast Asian Games silver medalists for Singapore
Southeast Asian Games bronze medalists for Singapore
Competitors at the 2009 Southeast Asian Games
Singapore Management University alumni